Frederick Keep Monument is a public artwork by American artist James Earle Fraser, located at Rock Creek Cemetery in Washington, D.C., United States. "Frederick Keep Monument" was originally surveyed as part of the Smithsonian's Save Outdoor Sculpture! survey in 1993. This sculpture rests at the site of the grave of Frederick and Florence Keep and their child.

Description

The main portion of this sculpture features a bronze female and male couple standing on a low rectangular base. The female raises both of her arms with her proper right and left hands resting on their respective shoulders. The male figure stands closely on her proper left side with his proper right arm behind her. Both of the figures are bare chested and wear loosely draped Roman-style drapery that is rolled at the waist, as well as Roman sandals. The female figure has a cape on over the back of her head and she looks downward. The male figure gazes out to the distance. They stand in front of a narrow granite wall.

The lower right side of the sculpture is signed: J. E. FRASER
The lower left side of the sculpture is marked: Kunst-Foundry N.Y.

The back of the granite base is inscribed:

FREDERIC A. KEEP
DIED JUNE 2, 1911
AGE 53 YEARS
FLORENCE SHEFFIELD BOARDMAN KEEP
DIED JAN 26, 1954
AGE 89 YEARS
INFANT OF F AND F. KEEP
DIED OCT. 6, 1902

Artist

Acquisition

The sculpture was installed just before or on October 3, 1920.

Information

Frederick Keep was a prominent Washington business man. His wife, Florence, was the sister of Mabel Thorp Boardman, one of the founders of the American Red Cross, and American socialite Josephine Porter Boardman. Her father, William J. Boardman, a lawyer and philanthropist who died August 2, 1915, is also buried in Rock Creek Cemetery. She traveled frequently (often with her sister Josephine) to places such as Panama and New Orleans. Florence was quite the socialite running in circles with the likes of Secretary of State John Hay, Agnes Meyer, Katharine Graham, Ruth Draper, and President & Mrs. Taft. A number of Florence Keep's personal belongings were donated to the National Museum of American History by her sister Josephine, including a late 1920s evening dress that was exhibited in the Hall of American Costume from 1964-1973.

Condition

This sculpture was surveyed in 1993 for its condition and it was described as needing treatment urgently.

References

Sources
James M. Goode, The Outdoor Sculpture of Washington, D.C., Smithsonian Institution Press, 1974, p. 343

Monuments and memorials in Washington, D.C.
Outdoor sculptures in Washington, D.C.
Burials at Rock Creek Cemetery
1920 sculptures
Bronze sculptures in Washington, D.C.
Works by James Earle Fraser (sculptor)
Cemetery art